Estelle Abrams Witherspoon (January 20, 1916 – December 24, 1998) was an American artist and civil rights activist. She was a founding member and longtime manager of the Freedom Quilting Bee, and is associated with the Gee's Bend quilting group, alongside her mother, Willie "Ma Willie" Abrams. She participated in the march from Selma to Montgomery in 1965, alongside Lucy Mingo. She was arrested in 1971 for participating in an un-permitted march for school desegregation.

References 

Quilters
1916 births
1998 deaths